Steamboat Willie is a 1928 American  film directed by Walt Disney and Ub Iwerks. It was produced in black and white by Walt Disney Studios and was released by Pat Powers, under the name of Celebrity Productions. The cartoon is considered the debut of both Mickey and Minnie Mouse, although both characters appeared several months earlier in a test screening of Plane Crazy. Steamboat Willie was the third of Mickey's films to be produced, but it was the first to be distributed, because Disney, having seen The Jazz Singer, had committed himself to produce one of the first fully synchronized sound cartoons.

Steamboat Willie is especially notable for being one of the first cartoons with synchronized sound, as well as one of the first cartoons to feature a fully post-produced soundtrack, which distinguished it from earlier sound cartoons, such as Inkwell Studios' Song Car-Tunes (1924–1926) and Van Beuren Studios' Dinner Time (1928). Disney knew that synchronized sound was the future of film. Steamboat Willie became the most popular cartoon of its day.

Music for Steamboat Willie was arranged by Wilfred Jackson and Bert Lewis, and it included the songs "Steamboat Bill", a composition popularized by baritone Arthur Collins during the 1910s, and "Turkey in the Straw", a composition popularized within minstrelsy during the 19th century. The title of the film may be a parody of the Buster Keaton film Steamboat Bill, Jr. (1928), itself a reference to the song by Collins. Disney performed all of the voices in the film, although there is little intelligible dialogue.

The film has received wide critical acclaim, not only for introducing one of the world's most popular cartoon characters but also for its technical innovation. In 1994, members of the animation field voted Steamboat Willie 13th in the book The 50 Greatest Cartoons, which listed the greatest cartoons of all time. In 1998, the film was selected for preservation in the United States' National Film Registry for being deemed "culturally, historically, or aesthetically significant."

Plot

Mickey Mouse pilots a steam river sidewheeler, suggesting that he is the captain. He cheerfully whistles "Steamboat Bill" and sounds the boat's three whistles. Soon the real captain, Pete, appears and orders Mickey off the bridge. Mickey blows a raspberry at Pete. Pete attempts to kick him, but Mickey rushes away in time and Pete accidentally kicks himself in the rear. Mickey rushes down the stairs, slips on a bar of soap on the boat's deck, and lands in a bucket of water, whereupon a parrot laughs at him, and Mickey throws the bucket on its head.

Pete, who has been watching the whole thing, pilots the steamboat himself. He bites off some chewing tobacco and spits into the wind. The spit flies backward and rings the boat's bell. Amused by this, Pete spits again, but this time the spit hits him in the face, making him fuss.

The steamboat makes a stop at "Podunk Landing" to pick up a cargo of various livestock. Just as they set off again, Minnie Mouse appears, running to catch the boat before it leaves. Mickey does not see her in time, but she runs after the boat along the shore and Mickey takes her on board by hooking the cargo crane to her bloomers.

Landing on deck, Minnie accidentally drops a ukulele and some sheet music for the song "Turkey in the Straw", which are eaten by a goat. Mickey fights over the goat with the eaten ukulele, but Mickey unexpectedly lets go of it. The goat suddenly goes crazy over the use of force, and the two mice began using the unconscious goat's body as a phonograph, which they play by turning its tail like a crank. Mickey uses various objects on the boat as percussion accompaniment and "plays" the animals like musical instruments. This ends with Mickey using a cow's teeth and tongue to play the song as a xylophone.

Captain Pete is unamused by the musical act and puts Mickey to work peeling potatoes. In the potato bin, the same parrot that laughed at him earlier appears in the porthole and laughs at him again. Fed up with the bird's heckling, Mickey throws a half-peeled potato at it, knocking it back into the river below. The film ends with Mickey laughing as he sits next to the potatoes.

Background 
According to Roy O. Disney, Walt Disney was inspired to create a sound cartoon after watching The Jazz Singer (1927). Disney created cartoons starring Mickey Mouse in secret while he fulfilled his contract for another series, Oswald the Lucky Rabbit. However, the first two Mickey Mouse films produced, silent versions of Plane Crazy and The Gallopin' Gaucho, had failed to impress audiences and gain a distributor. Disney believed that adding sound to a cartoon would greatly increase its appeal.

Steamboat Willie was not the first cartoon with synchronized sound. Starting in May 1924 and continuing through September 1926, Dave and Max Fleischer's Inkwell Studios produced 19 sound cartoons, part of the Song Car-Tunes series, using the Phonofilm sound-on-film process. However, the Song Car-Tunes failed to keep the sound fully synchronized, while Steamboat Willie was produced using a click track to keep his musicians on the beat. As little as one month before Steamboat Willie was released, Paul Terry released Dinner Time, which also used a soundtrack, but Dinner Time was not a financial success.

In June 1927, producer Pat Powers made an unsuccessful takeover bid for Lee DeForest's Phonofilm Corporation. In the aftermath, Powers hired a former DeForest technician, William Garrity, to produce a cloned version of the Phonofilm system, which Powers dubbed "Powers Cinephone". By then, DeForest was in too weak a financial position to mount a legal challenge against Powers for patent infringement. Powers convinced Disney to use Cinephone for Steamboat Willie; their business relationship lasted until 1930 when Powers and Disney had a falling-out over money, and Powers hired away from Disney's lead animator, Ub Iwerks.

Dialogue
Mickey, Minnie, and Pete perform in near-pantomime, with growls and squeaks but no intelligible dialogue. The only dialogue in the film is spoken by the ship's parrot. When Mickey falls into a bucket of soapy water, the bird says, "Hope you don't feel hurt, big boy! Ha ha ha ha ha!" At the end of the short, the parrot repeats the phrase, and after it falls into the water, it cries, "Help! Help! Man overboard!"

Production 

The production of Steamboat Willie took place between July and September 1928, with an estimated budget of $4,986. There was initially some doubt among the animators that a sound cartoon would appear believable enough, so before a soundtrack was produced, Disney arranged for a screening of the film to a test audience with live sound to accompany it. This screening took place on July 29, with Steamboat Willie only partly finished. The audience sat in a room adjoining Walt's office. Roy placed the movie projector outdoors and the film was projected through a window so that the sound of the projector would not interfere with the live sound. Ub Iwerks set up a bedsheet behind the movie screen behind which he placed a microphone connected to speakers where the audience would sit. The live sound was produced from behind the bedsheet. Wilfred Jackson played the music on a mouth organ, Ub Iwerks banged on pots and pans for the percussion segment, and Johnny Cannon provided sound effects with various devices, including slide whistles and spittoons for bells. Walt himself provided what little dialogue there was to the film, mostly grunts, laughs, and squawks. After several practices, they were ready for the audience, which consisted of Disney employees and their wives.

The response of the audience was extremely positive, and it gave Walt Disney the confidence to move forward and complete the film. He said later in recalling this first viewing, "The effect on our little audience was nothing less than electric. They responded almost instinctively to this union of sound and motion. I thought they were kidding me. So they put me in the audience and ran the action again. "It was terrible, but it was wonderful! And it was something new!" Iwerks said, "I've never been so thrilled in my life. Nothing since has ever equaled it."

Walt Disney traveled to New York City to hire a company to produce the sound system. He eventually settled on Pat Powers's Cinephone system, created by Powers using an updated version of Lee De Forest's Phonofilm system, without giving De Forest any credit, a decision that Powers later regretted.

The music in the final soundtrack was performed by the Green Brothers Novelty Band and was conducted by Carl Edouarde. Joe and Lew Green from the band also assisted in timing the music to the film. The first attempt to synchronize the recording with the film, done on September 15, 1928, was a disaster. Disney had to sell his Moon roadster in order to finance a second recording. This was a success, with the addition of a filmed bouncing ball to keep the tempo.

Release and reception 

Steamboat Willie premiered at Universal's Colony Theater in New York City on November 18, 1928. The film was distributed by Celebrity Productions, and its initial run lasted two weeks. Disney was paid $500 a week, which was considered a large amount at the time. It played ahead of the independent feature film Gang War. Steamboat Willie was an immediate hit, while Gang War is all but forgotten today.

The success of Steamboat Willie not only led to international fame for Walt Disney but for Mickey as well.

Variety (November 21, 1928) wrote: "Not the first animated cartoon to be synchronized with sound effects, but the first to attract favorable attention. This one represents a high order of cartoon ingenuity, cleverly combined with sound effects. The union brought forth laughs galore. Giggles came so fast at the Colony [Theater] they were stumbling over each other. It's a peach of a synchronization job all the way, bright, snappy, and fit the situation perfectly. Cartoonist, Walter Disney. With most of the animated cartoons qualifying as a pain in the neck, it's a signal tribute to this particular one. If the same combination of talent can turn out a series as good as Steamboat Willie they should find a wide market if the interchangeability angle does not interfere. Recommended unreservedly for all wired houses."

The Film Daily (November 25, 1928) said: "This is what Steamboat Willie has: First, a clever and amusing treatment; secondly, music and sound effects added via the Cinephone method. The result is a real tidbit of diversion. The maximum has been gotten from the sound effects. Worthy of bookings in any house wired to reproduce sound-on-film. Incidentally, this is the first Cinephone-recorded subject to get a public exhibition and at the Colony [Theater], New York, is being shown over Western Electric equipment."

Despite being popular in the U.S., Steamboat Willie did not have a theatrical European release until 1929, when it was released publicly in the United Kingdom by British International Film Distributors Incorporated.

Copyright status 
The film has been the center of a variety of controversies regarding copyright. The copyright of the film was extended by an act of the United States Congress. Since the copyright was filed in 1928 three days after its initial release, it was extended for over half a century.

The film has been the center of some attention regarding the 1998 Copyright Term Extension Act passed in the United States. Steamboat Willie was close to entering the public domain in the U.S. several times. Each time, copyright protection was extended. It could have entered the public domain in four different years: first in 1955, renewed to 1986, then to 2003 by the Copyright Act of 1976, and to the current date of 2023 by the Copyright Term Extension Act (also known pejoratively as the "Mickey Mouse Protection Act") of 1998. It has been claimed that these extensions were a response by Congress to extensive lobbying by The Walt Disney Company. Under current copyright law, Steamboat Willie will enter the US public domain on January 1, 2024.  However, the character of Mickey Mouse is still trademarked by Disney (which limits usage that could lead an observer to believe the product is from Disney), and later works featuring Mickey Mouse remain under copyright protection for the time being.

In the 1990s, former Disney researcher Gregory S. Brown determined that the film was likely in U.S. public domain already due to errors in the original copyright formulation. In particular, the original film's copyright notice had two additional names between Disney and the copyright statement. Thus, under the rules of the Copyright Act of 1909, all copyright claims would be null. Arizona State University professor Dennis Karjala suggested that one of his law school students look into Brown's claim as a class project. Lauren Vanpelt took up the challenge and produced a paper agreeing with Brown's claim. She posted her project on the Internet in 1999. Disney later threatened to sue a Georgetown University law student who wrote a paper confirming Brown's claims, alleging that publishing the paper could be slander of title. However, Disney chose not to sue after its publication.

Republican opposition to future extension 

Beginning in 2022, Republican lawmakers vowed to oppose any future attempt to extend the copyright term due to their opposition to some of Disney's progressive political stances (such as opposing the Florida Parental Rights in Education Act). Legal experts noted that later versions of Mickey Mouse created after Steamboat Willie will remain copyrighted, and Disney's recent use of the Steamboat Willie version as a logo in its modern movies may allow them to claim protection for the 1928 version under trademark law.  As active trademarks can be renewed in perpetuity (so long as the owner can prove using it).

Censorship 
In the 1950s, Disney removed a scene where Mickey tugs on the tails of the baby pigs, picks up the mother and kicks them off her teats, and plays her like a accordion, since television distributors deemed it inappropriate. Since then, the full version of the film was included on the 1998 compilation VHS The Spirit of Mickey and the Walt Disney Treasures DVD set "Mickey Mouse in Black and White", as well as on Disney+.

In other media 

Steamboat Willie-themed levels are featured in the video games Mickey Mania (1994), Kingdom Hearts II (2005), and Epic Mickey (2010). In Epic Mickey 2: The Power of Two (2012), a "Steamboat Willie" outfit can be obtained for Mickey. Sora's appearance in the Kingdom Hearts II Steamboat Willie-themed level was featured as an alternate costume in Super Smash Bros. Ultimate.

The fourth-season episode of The Simpsons, "Itchy & Scratchy: The Movie" features a short but nearly frame-for-frame parody of the opening scene of Steamboat Willie entitled Steamboat Itchy.

In the 1998 film Saving Private Ryan, set in 1944, a German POW tries to win the sympathy of his American captors by mentioning Steamboat Willie, even mimicking the sound of the boat whistle from the film. The unnamed character appears in the credits as "Steamboat Willie".

In the 2001 Mickey Mouse cartoon Mickey's April Fools, Mickey and Mortimer get sent to the President's office to claim a million dollars; Mortimer pretends to be Mickey, and he is shown acting in Steamboat Willie.

In Toontown Online, one of the buildings on Silly Street is named "Steamboat Willie".

In the Goofy cartoon How to Be a Waiter (1999), Goofy is shown as an example of a movie, and Steamboat Willie is shown. But in that short, Willie is a shortened version titled Steamboat Goofy.

The opening scene is parodied near the end of Aladdin and the King of Thieves (1996). Genie, having been swallowed by the giant turtle which carries the Vanishing Isle upon its back, comes back out of the turtle's mouth in the steamboat from this film and is even in Mickey's form, whistling "Turkey in the Straw".

In the 2008 movie of the TV series Futurama called The Beast with a Billion Backs, the opening is a parody of Steamboat Willie.

The beginning of season 2 of the TV series Alexei Sayle's Stuff (1989) shows a black-and-white animation entitled Steamboat Fatty, a parody of Steamboat Willie.

In the Pokémon: Diamond and Pearl anime, one of the episodes, "Steamboat Willies!", is a play on the title.

Since the release of Meet the Robinsons (2007), the scene of Mickey at the ship's wheel whistling "Steamboat Bill" has been used for Walt Disney Animation Studios' production logo. A "milestone" modification was used for Tangled (2010) and Encanto (2021), with text saying "Walt Disney Animation Studios: 50th/60th Animated Motion Picture" with the Mickey scene in the number "0"; the Encanto version using a shortened version. An 8-bit version of the logo was used for Wreck-It Ralph (2012). In Frozen (2013), Moana (2016), Frozen II (2019), Raya and the Last Dragon (2021), and Encanto, Mickey's whistling was muted to allow their respective opening themes to play out over the logo.

The cartoon was featured in Disney's Magical Mirror Starring Mickey Mouse (2002).

The Australian Perth Mint released a 1 kg gold coin in honor of Steamboat Willie. The AU$5,000 coin could sell for AU$69,700 as an official Disney licensed product.

On April 1, 2019, Lego released an official Steamboat Willie set to commemorate the 90th anniversary of Mickey Mouse.

On December 22, 2021, Disney released an NFT collection of "Steamboat Willie" on the VeVe platform.

Honors 
Steamboat Willie was inducted to the National Film Registry in 1998.

Release history 
 1928 (July) – First sound test screening (Silent with live sound)
 1928 (September) – First attempt to synchronize the recording on the film
 1928 (November) – Original theatrical release with final soundtrack
 1972 – The Mouse Factory, episode #33: "Tugboats" (TV)
 1990s – Mickey's Mouse Tracks, episode #45 (TV)
 1996 – Mickey's Greatest Hits
 1997 – Ink & Paint Club, episode #2 "Mickey Landmarks" (TV)
 Ongoing – Main Street Cinema at Disneyland

Home media
The short was released on December 2, 2002 on Walt Disney Treasures: Mickey Mouse in Black and White and on December 11, 2007 on Walt Disney Treasures: The Adventures of Oswald the Lucky Rabbit.

Additional releases include:
 1984 – Cartoon Classics: Limited Gold Editions: Mickey (VHS)
 1998 – The Spirit of Mickey (VHS)
 2001 – The Hand Behind the Mouse: The Ub Iwerks Story (VHS)
 2005 – Vintage Mickey (DVD)
 2009 – Snow White and the Seven Dwarfs (Blu-ray)
 2018 – Celebrating Mickey 90th-anniversary compilation (Blu-ray/DVD/Digital)
 Celebrating Mickey was reissued in 2021 as part of the U.S. Disney Movie Club exclusive The Best of Mickey Collection along with Fantasia and Fantasia 2000 (Blu-ray/DVD/Digital).
 2019 – Disney+ (streaming online)
 2023 - Mickey & Minnie: 10 Classic Shorts - Volume 1 95th-anniversary compilation (Blu-ray/DVD/Digital)

See also 
 Mickey Mouse (film series)

References

External links 
 Steamboat Willie essay  by Dave Smith, Chief Archivist Emeritus, The Walt Disney Company at National Film Registry
 Steamboat Willie essay by Daniel Eagan in America's Film Legacy: The Authoritative Guide to the Landmark Movies in the National Film Registry America's Film Legacy: The Authoritative Guide to the Landmark Movies in the National Film Registry, A&C Black, 2010 , pages 152-153
  (official posting by Walt Disney Animation Studios)
 
 
Steamboat Willie at the TCM Movie Database
 
 Steamboat Willie at The Encyclopedia of Disney Animated Shorts
 The Test Screening of Steamboat Willie

American musical comedy films
American black-and-white films
1920s Disney animated short films
1928 animated films
Mickey Mouse short films
United States National Film Registry films
Films directed by Walt Disney
Films directed by Ub Iwerks
Films produced by Walt Disney
Films set on ships
1920s American animated films
1920s musical comedy films
1920s English-language films
1928 short films
Animated films about cats
Animated films without speech
Films set on boats
1928 comedy films
Early sound films
American animated short films
Animated films about mice